In vehicle acrobatics, a wheelie, or wheelstand, is a vehicle maneuver in which the front wheel or wheels come off the ground due to sufficient torque being applied to the rear wheel or wheels, or rider motion relative to the vehicle. Wheelies are usually associated with bicycles and motorcycles, but can be done with other vehicles such as cars, especially in drag racing and tractor pulling.

History
The first wheelie was performed by trick bicyclist Daniel J. Canary in 1890, shortly after modern bicycles became popular. Writing in 2009, Mike Seate related to the U.S Army motorized cavalry training in 1943, pictured in Life magazine. Seate described "vaulting trenches and beach obstacles" and interpreted this technique as "High speed wheelies, naturally". Daredevil Evel Knievel performed motorcycle acrobatics including wheelies in his shows.  Doug "The Wheelie King" Domokos has accomplished such feats as a  wheelie.

Types
Types of wheelie can be divided into two broad categories:
1. wheelies in which the vehicle power is sufficient by itself, as described in the Physics section below. These include:
 Clutch wheelies: performed by revving the engine with the clutch disengaged, and then abruptly engaging (a.k.a. 'dumping') the clutch.
 Power wheelies or roll-on wheelies: performed by simply opening the throttle. If the engine has sufficient power, it will be able to lift the front wheel.

2. wheelies performed with the aid of suspension dynamics or rider motion. These include:
 Bounce wheelies or slap wheelies: performed by opening and closing the throttle in time with suspension rebounding, tire rebounding, rider motion, or any combination of the three.
 Manuals: performed without applying torque to the rear wheel at all, but instead by moving the rider's body backwards relative to the bike, and then pulling back on the handlebars near the end of available travel.

Bicycles
Wheelies are a common stunt in artistic cycling and freestyle BMX. The bike is balanced by the rider's weight and sometimes use of the rear brake. A style of bicycle, the wheelie bike, has a seating position, and thus center of mass, nearly over the rear wheel that facilitates performing wheelies.
The longest bicycle wheelie in one hour is 30.95 km (19.23 miles), and was achieved by Manuel Scheidegger (Switzerland) in Bern, Switzerland on 12 September 2020.

Motorcycle

A wheelie is also a common motorcycle stunt. The principles is the same as the bicycle wheelie, but the throttle and rear brakes are used to control the wheelie while a rider uses body weight and the steering to control the direction the inertia of the spinning front wheel acting as a balance.

April 18, 1999.

In some countries, such as the United Kingdom and USA, motorcyclists performing a wheelie on a public road may be prosecuted for dangerous driving, an offense which can carry a large fine and a ban of a year or more.

In Pakistan, India, and some other countries, it is illegal to perform these kinds of stunts. If someone is caught performing these acts, the rider can have their motorcycle impounded and potentially face jail time.

Automobiles
Wheelies are common in auto- or motorcycle drag racing, where they represent torque wasted lifting the front end, rather than moving the vehicle forward. They also usually result in raising the center of mass, which limits the maximum acceleration. In the absence of wheelie bars, this effect is quantified in the physics section below. If wheelie bars are present then a wheelie results in a reduction of load on the rear driving wheels, along with a corresponding reduction in friction.

Monster trucks

Monster trucks often perform wheelies during shows. Monster trucks have performed power wheelies, slap wheelies, and sky wheelies. To perform a sky wheelie, a monster truck jumps in such a way that the truck is vertical in the air, with the front end of the truck pointing upwards.

Snowmobiles
Wheelies are possible with some snowmobiles, whereby it is the skis that are lifted off the ground.

Wheelchairs
Some wheelchair users can learn to balance their chair on its rear wheels and do a wheelie. This enables them to climb and descend curbs and maneuver over small obstacles. Occasionally wheelchair dancers perform wheelies.

Aircraft
In an airplane, a wheelie is performed by conducting a soft-field landing or take-off procedure. The pilot increases the elevator backpressure so the nose wheel of the landing gear has minimal contact with the ground.

On 14 February 2020, the Guinness World Record for the longest-distance wheelie in an airplane was set in a Cessna 172 at Southern California Logistics Airport in Victorville, California on its runway 17. The pilot kept the plane's nose wheelie from touching the asphalt surface for a distance of 14,319 feet.

Wheelie bars

Wheelie bars help prevent a vehicle's front end from raising too high or flipping over. Wheelie bars are required for some tractor and truck pull events. Wham-O developed and sold an add-on wheelie bar for wheelie bikes.

Dougie's Wheelie
On September 25, 2016, British trials motorcyclist Dougie Lampkin successfully wheelied around the Isle of Man TT course. He completed the challenge in one hour and 35 minutes, after the attempt was postponed 24 hours because of strong winds.

Physics
A wheelie is imminent when the acceleration is sufficient to reduce the load borne by the front axle to zero. The conditions for this can be calculated with the so-called "weight transfer equation":

An equivalent expression, which does not require knowing the load borne by the front wheels nor the total vehicle mass, is for the minimum longitudinal acceleration required for a wheelie:

Thus the minimum acceleration required is directly proportional to how far forward the center of mass is located and inversely proportional to how high it is located.

Since mechanical power can be defined as force times velocity, in one dimension, and force is equivalent to mass times acceleration, then the minimum power required for a wheelie can be expressed as the product of mass, velocity, and the minimum acceleration required for a wheelie:

Thus the minimum power required is directly proportional to the mass of the vehicle and to its velocity. The slower a vehicle is moving, the less power is required to perform a wheelie, and that is without even considering the power required to overcome air drag, which increases with the cube of velocity. Therefore, the least amount of power required is when the vehicle begins accelerating from rest.

In the case of tractor and truck pulling, the force to the pull the load is applied above the ground, and so it also acts to lift the front wheels and thus reduces the forward acceleration necessary to lift the front wheels.

The total power  required during a wheel, neglecting air drag can be shown to be:

This can be separated into components necessary only for horizontal acceleration

and components necessary only for raising and rotating the vehicle

A factor M can be calculated as the ratio of the power required to raise and rotate the vehicle and the power required only for horizontal acceleration.

Gallery

See also
 Bicycle and motorcycle dynamics
 Ski (driving stunt)
 Stoppie
 Weight transfer

Notes

External links

 

Articles containing video clips
Cycling
Motorcycle stunts

de:Fahrtechnik#Auf dem Hinterrad fahren